A main line of resistance (MLR) is the most important defensive position of an army facing an opposing force over an extended front. It does not consist of one trench or line of pillboxes, but rather a system, of varying degrees of complexity, of fighting positions and obstacles to slow enemy advances.

History of concept 
The term first came into use during World War I, after fighting became stalemated across northern France. The French and British on one side, and the Germans on the other, built elaborate fortified defensive positions. These were characterized by extensive use of barbed wire, entrenchments and underground bunkers to protect their troops from enemy fire, and defeat enemy attacks. 

The depth of such positions could range from several hundred to several thousand meters, and in a few cases much farther. If the position was held in great depth, a screening line of strongpoints and fortified outposts - designed to slow and disorganize an enemy attack - might be constructed forward of the MLR, and a reserve line built behind it.

The most famous and elaborate MLR of World War I was the Siegfried Line (part of the longer German Hindenburg Line), across parts of northern France. 

During World War II, in which combat was relatively fluid, the term main line of resistance was used less often, and the positions the term described were usually less deep and complex than in World War I. However, there were exceptions, including the French Maginot Line, the German Atlantic Wall and Westwall (Siegfried Line to the Allies), as well as the Soviet defenses at the Battle of Kursk.

After the Korean War became static in 1951, MLR described the defensive positions of the U.N. Eighth Army, a series of trenches and bunkers extending east to west across the Korean peninsula.

Land warfare